The Marrithiyal, also  written Marithiel, are an Aboriginal Australian people whose traditional territory lay  south of the Daly River in the Northern Territory. They were sometimes known derogatively as Berringen  (Berinken, Brinken), a term used by the Mulluk-Mulluk to refer to "aliens" or "strangers".

Language
Marrithiyal is classified as one of the Daly River Languages Areal group, one of the prefixing non-Pama–Nyungan languages, exhibiting a distinctive phonemic inventory rare among Australian tongues. The Marrithiyal recognize three dialect variants: Marri Ammu, Marridan, and Marrisjabin, and at last count (2006) had an estimated 6 surviving speakers, though slightly earlier the figure had been put at 30. Most now speak a variety of Kriol. The autonym Marrithiyal has been conjectured to be derived from a combination of the words mari (speech) and thiel, meaning paperbark, suggesting the idea that the ethnonym denotes a 'people of the paperbark tea tree swamps', reflecting the fact that their homeland was rich in paper-bark forests. It was considered, by both whites and natives in the area, as particularly euphonious, especially compared to the 'rougher' sounding language of the Wagiman further west up river.

Mythology
In the Marrithiyal version of the Dreamtime story of the rainbow serpent, the serpent, lacking a wife, stole one from a flying fox who had two. The latter retaliated by spearing the rainbow serpent who plunged into the water, while the flying fox soared up to the sky. It is one variation on a story which has many different versions in this area.

History
Their traditional grounds lay south-west of the Majar hill in Madngella territory (now known as Hermit Hill) between the Daly and Fitzmaurice Rivers. Many Marrithiyal, as the tribe broke up, spread out into a variety of locations, some shifting to the lands of the former Kungarakany Tyaraity, and Wogait peoples, others taking up jobs in Darwin, at the Daly River peanut farms or working as stockmen at the Mt. Litchfield cattle station, or drifting into the Port Keats mission station.

Great hostility existed between the Marrithiyal-Marringar cluster, bundled together as 'Mooill', and a coalition of neighbouring tribes, the Mulluk-Mulluk and Nangiomeri, neither of whom would trade with the other, even though ceremonial occasions would at times require them to mix.

W. E. H. Stanner, who described them as a 'powerful sub-tribe' in the 1930s, originally spent some 6 weeks among the Marrithiyal in 1932, finding it somewhat difficult to enter into friendly relations with them, -troubles with the local police over the killing of a prospector accounting for their diffidence- though he eventually managed to gain their confidence and was allowed to be present and observe two complete circumcision ceremonies.

Notes

Citations

Sources

Aboriginal peoples of the Northern Territory